The U.S.  city of Oakland, California is the site of more than 95 high-rises, the majority of which are located in its downtown district. The tallest building is the 28-story Ordway Building, which rises .

History

The history of high-rises in Oakland began with the completion of the nine-story Bank of America Building in 1907. A nine-story section was later added to the same building. At the time it was built, the City Hall was the first high-rise government building in the United States and the tallest building west of the Mississippi River. The  Kaiser Center surpassed the height of the City Hall in 1960, and was the tallest building for a decade. In 1989, Ordway Building became the tallest building in the city.

, the tallest building currently under construction is the 36-story, 395 ft (120m) skyscraper at 1900 Broadway.

Tallest buildings

This includes spires and architectural details but does not include antenna masts. Existing structures are included for ranking purposes based on present height. An equal sign (=) following a rank indicates the same height between two or more buildings. Table entries with dashes (—) indicate that information regarding building is not known. The "Year" column indicates the year in which a building was completed or opened.

Timeline of tallest buildings

References
General

Specific

External links

Diagram of Oakland skyscrapers on SkyscraperPage

Skyscrapers in Oakland, California
Tallest buildings
Landmarks in the San Francisco Bay Area
Oakland
Oakland